The social cost of carbon (SCC) is the marginal cost of the impacts caused by emitting one extra tonne of greenhouse gas (carbon dioxide equivalent) at any point in time, inclusive of 'non-market' impacts on the environment and human health. The purpose of putting a price on a ton of emitted  is to aid policymakers or other legislators in evaluating whether a policy designed to curb climate change is justified. The social cost of carbon is a calculation focused on taking corrective measures on climate change which can be deemed a form of market failure. The Intergovernmental Panel on Climate Change suggested that a carbon price from $135 to $5,500/t in 2030, and from $245 to $13,000 in 2050 (2010 US dollars), would be needed to drive carbon emissions to stay below the 1.5 °C limit.

Calculating 
Calculating the SCC requires estimating the impacts of climate change. This includes impacts on human health, as measured by the amount of damage done and the cost to remedy it. Valuations can be difficult because the impacts on ecosystems do not have a market price. In economics, comparing impacts over time involves a discount rate or time preference. This rate determines the weight placed on impacts occurring at different times.

Best estimates of the SCC come from integrated assessment models (IAM) which predict the effects of climate change under various scenarios and allow for calculation of monetized damages. One of the most widely used IAMs is the Dynamic Integrated model of Climate and the Economy (DICE).

The DICE model, developed by William Nordhaus, makes provisions for the calculation of a social cost of carbon. The DICE model defines the SCC to be "equal to the economic impact of a unit of emissions in terms of t-period consumption as a numéraire".

Other popular IAMs used to calculate the social cost of carbon include the Policy Analysis for Greenhouse Effect Model (PAGE) and the Climate Framework for Uncertainty, Negotiation, and Distribution (FUND).

In the United States, using existing IAMs to calculate the SCC has been criticized for lacking appropriate calculations for interactions between regions. For instance, climate catastrophes caused by climate change in one region may have a domino impact on the economy of neighboring regions or trading partners.

The Interagency Working Group in the United States usually uses four values when calculating the cost. The values come from using a discount rate of 2.5%, 3%, and 5% from the integrated assessment models. The SCC that is being found must include the different probabilities based on what mitigation is being used for climate change that betters or worsens the environment. This is where the fourth value comes into play, because there can be lower-probability, but higher-impact outcomes from climate change. The fourth value zones in on the 3% discounts rate and is set to the 95th percentile when distributing the frequency estimates.

These calculations do not show a scenario in which there are mitigation policies in place. In "The U.S. Government’s Social Cost of Carbon Estimates after Their First Two Years: Pathways for Improvement", Kopp and Mignone suggest that these calculation rates do not reflect the multiple ways that humans can respond to climate change. They propose an alternative approach that should be considered by calculating through a cost-benefit optimization analysis based on if the public "panics" about climate change and implement mitigation policies accordingly.

Tipping points

Discount rate 

What discount rate to use is "consequential and contentious" because it defines the relative value of present costs and future damages, an inherently ethical and political judgment. A 2015 survey of 200 general economists found that most preferred a rate between 1% and 3%. Some, like Nordhaus, advocate for a time discount rate that is pegged to the current average rate of time discount as estimated from market interest rates–this is spurious reasoning because intragenerational interest rates have nothing to do with the intergenerational ones in question. Others, like Stern, propose a much smaller discount rate because "normal" discount rates are skewed when applied over the time scales over which climate change acts. A 2015 survey of 1,100 economists who had published on climate change found that those who estimated discount rates preferred that they decline over time and that explicit ethical considerations be factored in.

Carbon pricing recommendations 

According to economic theory, a carbon price should be set equal to the SCC. In reality, carbon tax and carbon emission trading only cover a limited number of countries and sectors. The 2018 IPCC report suggested that a carbon price of $135–5.500 in 2030 and $245–13.000/t in 2050 would be needed to drive carbon emissions to stay below the 1.5 °C limit. This is more than three times higher than for a 2 °C limit. Large studies in the late 2010s estimated the social cost of carbon as high as $417/t or as low as $54/t. Both those studies subsume wide ranges; the latter is a meta-study whose source estimates range from -$13.36/t to $2,386.91/t. Note that the costs derive not from the element carbon, but the molecule carbon dioxide. Each tonne of carbon dioxide consists of about 0.27 tonnes of carbon and 0.73 tonnes of oxygen. 
 
In 2021, the study "The social cost of carbon dioxide under climate-economy feedbacks and temperature variability" estimated even costs of more than $300/t. A study published in September 2022 in Nature estimated the social cost of carbon (SCC) to be $185 per tonne of —3.6 times higher than the U.S. government's then-current value of $51 per tonne.

According to David Anthoff and Johannes Emmerling, the social cost of carbon can be expressed by the following equation: . 

This equation represents how one additional ton of carbon dioxide impacts the environment and incorporates equity and social impact. Chen, Van der Beek, and Cloud inquire upon the benefits of incorporating a second measure of the externalities of carbon by accounting for both the social cost of carbon and risk cost of carbon. This technique involves accounting for the cost of risk on climate change goals. Matsuo and Schmidt suggest that carbon policies revolve around two renewable energy targets. They focus on bringing the cost down of renewable energy and growth of the industry. The trouble with these objectives in policy is that prioritization can affect how the policy plays out. This can result in a negative impact on the social cost of carbon by affecting how renewable energy is incorporated into society. Newbery, Reiner, and Ritz discuss a carbon price floor in the article “The political economy of a carbon price floor for power generation” as a means of attributing to the social cost of carbon. They discuss how incorporating a CPF in SCC can have a long-term effect of less coal usage, an increase in electricity pricing, and more innovation and investment in low-carbon alternatives.

Use in investment decisions 
Organizations that take an integrated management approach are using the social cost of carbon to help evaluate investment decisions and guide long-term planning in order to consider the full extent of how their operations impact society and the environment. By placing a value on carbon emissions, decision makers can use this value to expand upon traditional financial decision-making tools and create new metrics for measuring the short and long-term outcomes of their actions. This means taking the triple bottom line a step further and promotes an integrated bottom line (IBL) approach. Prioritizing an IBL approach begins with changing the way we think about traditional financial measurements as these do not take into consideration the full extent of the short and long-term impacts of a decision or action. Instead, return on investment can be expanded to return on integration, internal rate of return can evolve into integrated rate of return and instead of focusing on net present value, companies can plan for integrated future value.

By country 
The SCC is estimated to be high in India, China, Saudi Arabia and the United States, and is very sensitive to socioeconomic narratives.

United States 
In February 2021 the US government set the social cost of carbon to $51 per tonne, based on a 3% discount rate, but it plans a more thorough review of the issue.  However, in February 2022 a court ruled against the government and said the figure was invalid as only damage within the US could be included. In March 2022, a three-judge panel of the 5th Circuit Court of Appeals stayed his injunction, permitting continued use of the interim figure. The social cost of carbon is used in policymaking.

Executive Order 12866 requires agencies to consider the costs and benefits of any potential regulations and, bearing in mind that some factors may be difficult to assign monetary value, only propose regulations whose benefits would justify the cost. Social cost of carbon estimates allow agencies to bring considerations of the impact of increased carbon dioxide emissions into cost-benefit analyses of proposed regulations.

The United States government was not required to implement greenhouse gas emission requirements until after the 2007 court case Massachusetts v. EPA. The U.S. government struggled to implement greenhouse gas emission requirements due to the lack of an accurate social cost on carbon to guide policy making.

Due to the varying estimates of the social cost of carbon, in 2009, the Office of Management and Budget (OMB) and the Council of Economic Advisers established the Interagency Working Group on the Social Cost of Greenhouse Gases (IWG) in an attempt to develop standards estimates of SCC for the use of federal agencies considering regulatory policies. This establishment was formerly named Interagency Working Group on the Social Cost of Carbon, but has now extended to include multiple greenhouse gasses. The IWG works closely with the National Academies of Sciences, Engineering, and Medicine when researching and creating an up to date report on the SCC.

When developing the 2010 and 2013 social cost of carbon estimates, the U.S. Government Accountability Office used a consensus-based approach with working groups alongside of existing academic works, studies, and models. These created estimates for the social costs and benefits that government agencies could use when creating environmental policies. Members of the public are able to comment on the developed social cost of carbon.

Along with the Office of Management and Budget (OMB) and the Council of Economic Advisers, six federal agencies worked in the working group. The agencies involved included, The Environmental Protection Agency (EPA), United States Department of Agriculture, United States Department of Commerce, United States Department of Energy, United States Department of Transportation (DOT), and the United States Department of Treasury. The Interagency Working Group analyzed and advised that policy surrounding the social cost of carbon must be implemented based on global impacts instead of domestic. Support for this expansion in scope stems from theories that climate change may lead to global migration and political and environmental destabilization that affects both the national security and economy of the United States, as well as its allies and trading partners. The social cost of carbon In the United States Government should be seen as a way to continuously update estimates with an end goal of public and scientific approval in order to make efficient environmental policy.

The price being set for the social cost of carbon is dependent upon the administration in charge. While Obama was in office, the administration paved the way for the first estimate of putting a price on carbon emissions. The administration estimated that the cost would be $36 per tonne in 2015, $42 in 2020, and $46 in 2025.

The Trump administration estimated between $1–$7 in economic damage in 2020. Trump's Executive Order 13783 mandated that SCC estimates be calculated based on guidelines from the 2003 OMB Circular A-4, rather than guidelines based on more recent climate science.

In November 2022, the EPA issued an estimate of $190 per ton for 2020.

Criticism 
The SCC has been criticized as being extremely uncertain, having to change over time and according to the level of emissions, and is claimed to be useless to policymakers as the Paris Agreement has a goal of 2 °C temperature rise. Calculating the SCC brings about a degree of uncertainty particularly due to unknown future economic growth and development as well as pending climate system response. Furthermore, the figures produced from the SCC cause calculations to be produced on a range with the most commonly utilized number being the central case value (an average over the entire data set at a given discount rate). The SCC is no longer used for policy appraisal in the UK or the EU.

History 
The concept of a social cost of carbon was first mooted by the Reagan administration of the United States in 1981. Federal agencies such as the Environmental Protection Agency and Department of Transportation began to develop other forms of social cost calculations from carbon during the George H. W. Bush administration. Furthermore, economic social cost from carbon was judicially mandated in cost-benefit analysis for new policy in 2008 following a decision by a federal appellate court. The year following in 2009 there was a call for a uniform calculation of social cost from carbon to be utilized by the government.

References

IPCC

Other references 

Carbon finance
Low-carbon economy